The Red Horses may refer to:

 The Red Horses (1950 film), Danish film
 The Red Horses (1954 film), Swedish film